The Tunisia national football team manager was first established in 1956 following the appointment of the country's first national team manager Rachid Turki.

Thirty-six men have occupied the post since its inception; three of those were in short-term caretaker manager roles: Faouzi Benzarti in two terms (one game in charge in 1994 and four games in 2010), Sami Trabelsi (six games in 2011 until he was appointed full-time) and Ruud Krol (two games).

Roger Lemerre held the position for the longest to date with a tenure of six years leading the team in 67 matches, more than any other manager in Tunisia's history. He is also the most successful manager after winning the 2004 Africa Cup of Nations, reaching 2005 FIFA Confederations Cup and qualifying for the 2006 FIFA World Cup. Yugoslav coach Milan Kristić became the first foreign manager of the team in 1960.

France has the largest number of managers to have coached Tunisia, with six managers.

Position

Role 
The Tunisia manager's role means he has sole responsibility for all on-the-field elements of the Tunisian team. Among other activities, this includes selecting the national team squad, the starting team, captain, tactics, substitutes and penalty-takers.

The coach has a relative freedom to choose his staff as some of coaches refused to coach the Tunisian national team due to the Tunisian Football Federation’s refusal to appoint foreign assistant coaches. This was the case with Jacques Santini in 2008 and Raymond Domenech. However, the Tunisian Football Federation agreed to Henryk Kasperczak's proposal in 2015 to appoint Frenchman Patrick Hesse to the team.

Appointment 
The process of appointing a new Tunisia manager is undertaken by a FTF committee, which is composed of board members and other high-ranking FTF officials.

Every time this process is subject to controversy because the committee includes former coaches who did not succeed with the national team, such as Youssef Zouaoui and Mokhtar Tlili.

List 
As of 30 November 2022 after match against .

Statistics

Coaches by nationality

References 

 
Tunisia